Thomas Do Canto (born 30 May 1986) is an Australian long-distance runner. In 2018, he competed in the men's half marathon at the 2018 IAAF World Half Marathon Championships held in Valencia, Spain. He finished in 71st place.

In 2016, he won the Melbourne Marathon held in Melbourne, Australia.

References

External links 
 

Living people
1986 births
Place of birth missing (living people)
Australian male long-distance runners
Australian male marathon runners
21st-century Australian people